"The Hunger Strike" is the fourth episode of the first series of the 1990s British comedy television series Jeeves and Wooster. It is also called "How Does Gussie Woo Madeline?". The episode aired in the US on 2 December 1990 on Masterpiece Theatre.

Background 
Adapted from the book Right Ho, Jeeves, by P. G. Wodehouse and dramatized by Clive Exton.

Cast
 Bertie Wooster – Hugh Laurie
 Jeeves – Stephen Fry
 Aunt Dahlia – Brenda Bruce
 Tom Travers – Ralph Michael
 Angela Travers – Amanda Elwes
 Gussie Fink-Nottle – Richard Garnett
 Tuppy Glossop – Robert Daws
 Madeline Bassett – Francesca Folan
 Anatole – John Barrard
 Barmy Fotheringay-Phipps – Adam Blackwood
 Oofy Prosser – Richard Dixon
 Drones Porter – Michael Ripper

Plot
Aunt Dahlia coerces Bertie into handing out the prizes at Market Snodsbury Grammar School by threatening to withhold the services of her master chef, Anatole, being the supremely skilled French chef of Aunt Dahlia at her country house Brinkley Court. Bertie tries to sort out Tuppy Glossop and Angela Travers's relationship, Gussie and Madeline's relationship, and an issue Aunt Dahlia has with her husband—all without the help of Jeeves.  Bertie recommends that they make a hunger strike in order to provoke feelings of guilt in others and to go without dinner, but this backfires when the others remain completely oblivious and an offended Anatole gives notice.

Newt-fancier Gussie Fink-Nottle comes to Jeeves for advice about Madeline Bassett, with whom he is enamoured.  Since she is staying at Brinkley Court with Aunt Dahlia, Bertie delegates Gussie to give the prizes.

See also
 List of Jeeves and Wooster characters

References

External links

Jeeves and Wooster episodes
1990 British television episodes